Makiyamaia mammillata is a species of sea snail, a marine gastropod mollusk in the family Clavatulidae.

Description

Distribution
This marine species is found in Tosa Bay, Japan and off Taiwan

References

 Higo, S., Callomon, P. & Goto, Y. (1999). Catalogue and bibliography of the marine shell-bearing Mollusca of Japan. Osaka. : Elle Scientific Publications. 749 pp.
 Liu J.Y. [Ruiyu] (ed.). (2008). Checklist of marine biota of China seas. China Science Press. 1267 pp.

External links
 Specimen at MNHN, Paris

mammillata
Gastropods described in 1961